The following lists events that happened in 1996 in Iceland.

Incumbents
President – Vigdís Finnbogadóttir (until 1 August), Ólafur Ragnar Grímsson (starting 1 August)
Prime Minister – Davíð Oddsson

Births
 13 January – Aníta Hinriksdóttir, middle-distance runner

 
1990s in Iceland
Iceland
Iceland
Years of the 20th century in Iceland